Kingston SE (Kingston South East to distinguish it from Kingston-on-Murray) formerly Kingston is a town in the Australian state of South Australia located in the state's south-east coastline on the shores of Lacepede Bay. At the 2016 census, Kingston SE had a population of 1,648.

History
Kingston, South Australia was established in the 1800s by Archibald, his brother James Cooke and James' wife Mrs. Mary Macpherson Cooke. Much later a Sir George Strickland Kingston, a South Australian politician, surveyor and architect was chosen, for the co-incidence of his name, to open the Kingston Post Office on 9 February 1869.  The extension on its name is to distinguish Kingston in the South East (of South Australia) from another 'Kingston' in the state which is now officially named "Kingston on Murray". The extension was added in July 1940. The present-day town of Kingston SE includes the original Kingston, as well as the towns of Port Caroline and Maria Creek.

The town was connected to Naracoorte by a 1,070 mm railway known as the Kingston-Naracoorte railway in 1876, providing a port for the grain and wool grown away from the coast. The rails were converted to broad gauge 1,600 mm with a new station built on the edge of town in 1959. The railway closed on 28 November 1987 then was dismantled on 15 September 1991.

Media 
The region was formerly serviced by two newspapers: the Kingston Weekly, the newspaper of The Kingston Traders' Association, was issued between 22 March 1946 and 30 March 1951. Later, the South-East Kingston Leader was started in Kingston, and was published from 1962 until 21 November 2001 when it was renamed Coastal Leader. It is now owned by Australian Community Media.

Today
The main industries are fishing, wine-making, sheep and cattle farming and recreation, the district having a large influx of tourists during holiday periods throughout the year.

The northern entrance to the town is dominated by the Big Lobster, named "Larry" by people in Kingston.
 
The town has an Australian rules football team competing in the Kowree-Naracoorte-Tatiara Football League.

Kingston SE is home to the Cape Jaffa Lighthouse, which was moved to its current location from its former location on Margaret Brock Reef, and now operates as a museum. The museum also houses a lifeboat from MS Oliva which washed ashore after two years adrift.

Climate
Kingston SE experiences a warm-summer mediterranean climate (Köppen: Csb, Trewartha: Csbl), with warm, dry summers; mild, relatively dry springs and autumns; and mild winters with moderate precipitation.

See also
List of places called Kingston

References 

Coastal towns in South Australia
Limestone Coast